Li Yin (C. 1610 – 1685), also known by her courtesy name Jinsheng (今生) and her art names Shi'an (是庵) and Kanshan Nüshi, was a Chinese painter, poet, and calligrapher during the late Ming and early Qing dynasties, noted for her flowers and birds. Her artwork was sought after in her lifetime, resulting in as many as forty imitators in her area producing fakes of her works.

Early life 
Li Yin was born in Kuaiji (Shaoxing), Zhejiang, during the late Ming dynasty. Various sources give her year of birth as 1610, 1611, or 1616. Her family background is not known but according to a contemporary biographical sketch her parents made her study poetry and painting from an early age. Their financial circumstances were poor enough that she was said to have stored up liver mosses as paper and persimmon sticks to write with. She likely made a living as a courtesan, as her contemporary biographer Huang Zongxi compares her to Wang Wei and Liu Rushi, two famous courtesans of the era. She studied painting from the artists Chen Chun and Ye Danian (葉大年).

Marriage with Ge Zhengqi 
By the time she was a teen, Li's talent in both art and poetry was already recognized. The scholar-official and artist , moved by a poem of hers, married her as a concubine. They had a close relationship and spent much time together painting and composing calligraphy.

During the reign of the Chongzhen Emperor, Ge served as an official in the imperial court in Beijing, where he and Li lived for more than ten years. He travelled extensively for official business, and Li accompanied him to numerous places along the Yellow River and the Yangtze in their 15 years of marriage. She often composed poems about what she saw in her travels.

Near the end of the Chongzhen reign, Ming China became increasingly unstable. In 1643, Ge and Li left Beijing for Nanjing, the country's southern capital. When they reached Suzhou, Anhui, they encountered a military rebellion. Li, wounded in the chaos, stayed to search for her husband instead of fleeing the danger, and abandoned all her belongings except her poems. Ge was greatly moved by her loyalty and bravery. His disciple, Lu Chuan, later wrote prefaces to her poetry collections, in which he praises her as a loyal "minister" to Ge and compares her to the ancient beauty Xi Shi.

Later life 
After the fall of the Ming, the Manchu Qing dynasty invaded China and Ge died of suicide in 1645 when Nanjing fell. She lived for forty more years, supporting herself by selling her paintings. The renowned scholar Huang Zongxi wrote her biography.

Li was childless. On her 70th birthday, she composed a poem expressing her mixed feelings on not having children:

Works

Over the course of her travels, Li Yin wrote 260 long and short poems that were published in two collections.

Li Yin is noted for her paintings of flowers and birds, typically in ink monochrome with fluid brushstrokes. Her reputation was such that her paintings were considered an essential souvenir from Haichang and it is estimated there were forty imitators in the area turning out fakes of her works. She painted with a flowing ink style reminiscent of Chen Chun (1483–1544), and was considered one of the finest women painters by critic Qin Zuyong. Many of her paintings are in the collection of the Palace Museum, including:

Flowers and Birds
Pine and Eagle
Willows and Magpies
Mynas and Pomegranates
Lotus and Mandarin Ducks
Flowers and Plants

Her other paintings include:
Flowers of the Four Seasons, 1649. Ink on satin.
Yellow Hibiscus, date unknown, Ink on gold paper fan.
Rock, Bird, and Pear Blossoms, 1654. Ink and colour on gold paper fan.
Swallows and Peonies, 1673. Ink on satin hanging scroll.

References

External links 

1610s births
1685 deaths
17th-century Chinese calligraphers
17th-century Chinese poets
Artists from Shaoxing
Chinese women artists
Chinese women poets
Ming dynasty calligraphers
Ming dynasty poets
Poets from Zhejiang
Qing dynasty calligraphers
Qing dynasty poets
Writers from Shaoxing